The NHL on SportsChannel America was the presentation of National Hockey League broadcasts on the now defunct SportsChannel America cable television network.

Terms of the deal
Taking over for ESPN, SportsChannel's contract paid US$51 million ($17 million per year) over three years, more than double what ESPN had paid ($24 million) for the previous three years SportsChannel America managed to get a fourth NHL season for just $5 million.

The SportsChannel America deal was in a sense, a power play created by Charles Dolan and Bill Wirtz. Dolan was still several years away from getting control of Madison Square Garden, and Wirtz owned 25% of SportsChannel Chicago. NHL president John Ziegler convinced the board of governors that SportsChannel America was a better alternative than a proposed NHL Channel backed by Paramount and Viacom that had interests in the MSG Network and NESN.

SportsChannel's availability
Unfortunately, SportsChannel America was only available in a few major markets (notably absent though were Detroit, Pittsburgh, and St. Louis) and reached only a 1/3 of the households that ESPN did at the time. SportsChannel America was seen in fewer than 10 million households. In comparison, by the 1991–92 season, ESPN was available in 60.5 million homes whereas SportsChannel America was available in only 25 million. As a matter of fact, in the first year of the deal, SportsChannel America was available in only 7 million homes when compared to ESPN's reach of 50 million. When the SportsChannel deal ended in 1992, the league returned to ESPN for another contract that would pay US$80 million over five years.

SportsChannel America took advantage of using their regional sports networks' feed of a game, graphics and all, instead of producing a show from the ground up, most of the time. Distribution of SportsChannel America across the country was limited to cities that had a SportsChannel regional sports network or affiliate. Very few cable systems in non-NHL territories picked it up as a stand-alone service, with many only taking it on a pay-per-view basis during the Stanley Cup Finals. In addition to the SportsChannel regional networks, Maryland-based Home Team Sports and Minneapolis-based Midwest Sports Channel (independently owned and operated despite the similar sounding name) carried the games. In 1991, two Prime Sports networks, KBL (Pittsburgh) and  Prime Sports Northwest agreed to carry the playoff package, expanding it reach to an additional 2.6 million homes.

Philadelphia
Since SportsChannel Philadelphia did not air until January 1990, PRISM (owned by Rainbow Media, the owners of SportsChannel, at the time) picked up the 1989 Stanley Cup Finals. Other than that, there was no NHL television coverage in Philadelphia except for the Flyers for the first half of the original deal.

Lawsuit
As previously mentioned, the NHL would return to ESPN following the 1991–92 season. Shortly after the ESPN deal was signed, SportsChannel America would contend that its contract with the NHL gave them the right to match third-party offers for television rights for the 1992–93 season. SportsChannel America accused the NHL of violating a nonbinding clause. SportsChannel America argued that it had been deprived of its contractual right of first refusal for the 1992–93 season. Appellate Division of New York State Supreme Court justice Shirley Fingerwood would deny SportsChannel America's request for an injunction against the NHL. Upholding that opinion, the appellate court found the agreement on which SportsChannel based its argument to be "too imprecise and ambiguous" and ruled that SportsChannel failed to show irreparable harm.

In the aftermath of losing the NHL, SportsChannel America was left with little more than outdoors shows and Canadian Football League games. For SportsChannel, the deal was a disaster overall. While the cable channel three years later, was available in 20 million homes (as previously mentioned), the broadcaster lost as much as $10 million on the agreement, and soon faded into obscurity. Some local SportsChannel stations – which carried NHL games in their local markets – were not affected.

Coverage overview

Regular season coverage
SportsChannel America televised about 80–100 games a season (whereas ESPN aired about 33 in the  season). Whereas the previous deal with ESPN called for only one nationally televised game a week, SportsChannel America televised hockey two nights a week in NHL cities and three nights a week elsewhere.

It was very rare to have a regular-season game on SportsChannel America that wasn't a regional SportsChannel production from the Chicago Blackhawks, Hartford Whalers, New Jersey Devils, New York Islanders, or Philadelphia Flyers. As previously suggested, SportsChannel America for the most part, used the local telecasts. The dedicated SportsChannel America station was little more than an overflow channel in the New York area for SportsChannel New York.

Special programming
In 1989, SportsChannel America provided the first ever American coverage of the NHL Draft. In September 1989, SportsChannel America covered the Washington Capitals' training camp in Sweden and pre-season tour of the Soviet Union. The Capitals were joined by the Stanley Cup champion Calgary Flames, who held training camp in Prague, Czechoslovakia and then ventured to the Soviet Union. Each team played four games against Soviet National League clubs. Games were played in Moscow, Leningrad, Kiev and Riga. The NHL clubs finished with a combined 6–2 record against the top Soviet teams, including the Red Army club and Dynamo Moscow. Five of the eight contests were televised by SportsChannel America.

All-Star Game coverage
SportsChannel America was the exclusive American broadcaster of the 1989 All-Star Game. The following year, they covered the first ever NHL Skills Competition and Heroes of Hockey game. SportsChannel America would continue their coverage of these particular events through 1992. In 1991, SportsChannel America replayed the third period of the All-Star Game on the same day that it was played. That was because NBC broke away from the live telecast during the third period in favor of Gulf War coverage.

Stanley Cup playoffs

Divisional finals

Conference finals

Stanley Cup Final

Notes 
SportsChannel America's national coverage of the 1990 Stanley Cup Finals was blacked out in the Boston area due to the local rights to Bruins games in that TV market. NESN televised three games at Boston Garden in the Boston area while WSBK had two games in Edmonton. In , SportsChannel's Stanley Cup Final coverage was again blacked out in the Minnesota and Pittsburgh areas due to the local rights to North Stars and Penguins games in those respective TV markets. In Minnesota, KMSP-TV aired three games in Pittsburgh while the Midwest Sports Channel had three games in Bloomington. In Pittsburgh, KBL televised three games at the Igloo while KDKA aired three games in Minnesota. Had there been a Game 7, it would have aired on KMSP-TV in Minnesota and KBL in Pittsburgh respectively. However, in Chicago, SportsChannel Chicago aired the first two games, and Hawkvision aired the next two.

Production
SportsChannel America's Master Control facilities were located in Floral Park, NY at Cablevision's Rainbow Network Communications facilities, and their studios were located at Dempster Hall at Hofstra University in Hempstead, NY. Most of the games that aired on the network were simulcasts of the other SportsChannel Regional games. However, there were times when the network did produce games of importance not available on one of the regional networks.

If any of the aforementioned teams made the playoffs, SportsChannel America focused on those teams. For example, SportsChannel Chicago produced the SportsChannel America coverage for the Blackhawks' 1990 playoff run. Because Blackhawks owner Bill Wirtz' disdain for free and basic cable home game telecasts, the road games were shown in Chicago, with the home games only given short live look-ins as "bonus coverage". The same occurrence happened in 1992, but this time, their home games were broadcast on a pay-per-view basis via "Hawkvision". The Blackhawks broadcasts were also simulcast on Chicago's WBBM radio during those years. The typical outcue to commercial break was...."(score) on SportsChannel......(pause) and WBBM" SportsChannel America would run their own bumper music from the Floral Park Master Control facility so that they could fade out the remote's audio after the announcers said "SportsChannel".

For the Stanley Cup playoffs, SportsChannel America used Bob Papa as the anchor for the coverage. The studio kicked off coverage of each night with a pregame show for all of the regions. Once the games began, the studio produced live cut-ins of every goal to each of the regional games aired. The studio also switched viewers of one game to another game when a period ended or when the game was over. At the completion of the early games, the studio then took all viewers out to a west coast game. At the completion of all hockey for the night, the studio finished the night with a postgame wrap up show. In 1989, both Conference Finals series involved two of SportsChannel's regional teams.

Announcers
Bob Papa and Leandra Reilly were the studio hosts during the regular season coverage. Denis Potvin was the studio analyst during the regular season coverage. For the Stanley Cup Finals, Jiggs McDonald called the play-by-play, and Bill Clement was the color commentator. Also during the Stanley Cup Finals, Mike Emrick served as the host while John Davidson served as the rinkside and studio analyst (Herb Brooks filled that role in 1989).

Play-by-play
Chris Cuthbert
Mike Emrick
Pat Foley
Steve Grad
Randy Hahn
Dave Hodge
John Kelly
Jiggs McDonald
Rick Peckham
Jeff Rimer
Joe Starkey
Gary Thorne
Ken Wilson

Color commentary
Bruce Affleck
Mike Bossy
Scotty Bowman
Herb Brooks
Gerry Cheevers
Bill Clement
John Davidson
Don Edwards
John Garrett
John Kelly
Craig Laughlin
Dave Maloney
Peter McNab
Joe Micheletti
Jim Peplinski
Denis Potvin
Pete Stemkowski
Dale Tallon
Ed Westfall

Studio/ice level personalities
Mike Breen
Herb Brooks
John Davidson
Stan Fischler
Al Koken
Dave Maloney
Bob Papa
Denis Potvin
Leandra Reilly
Lee Zeidman

Commentating crews 
Chicago Blackhawks: Pat Foley and Dale Tallon (in 1992, SportsChannel America rode them all the way through the Stanley Cup Finals)
SportsChannel Chicago
Hartford Whalers: Rick Peckham and Gerry Cheevers
SportsChannel New England
New York Islanders: Jiggs McDonald and Ed Westfall
SportsChannel New York
New Jersey Devils: Gary Thorne and Peter McNab
SportsChannel New York
Philadelphia Flyers: Mike Emrick and Bill Clement
SportsChannel Philadelphia
San Jose Sharks: Joe Starkey or Randy Hahn and Pete Stemkowski (most games) or Brian Hayward (when Hayward is injured)
SportsChannel Pacific

See also

Chicago Blackhawks seasons
1988–89 Chicago Blackhawks season
1989–90 Chicago Blackhawks season
1990–91 Chicago Blackhawks season
1991–92 Chicago Blackhawks season

Hartford Whalers seasons
1988–89 Hartford Whalers season
1989–90 Hartford Whalers season
1990–91 Hartford Whalers season
1991–92 Hartford Whalers season

New York Islanders seasons
1988–89 New York Islanders season
1989–90 New York Islanders season
1990–91 New York Islanders season
1991–92 New York Islanders season

New Jersey Devils seasons
1988–89 New Jersey Devils season
1989–90 New Jersey Devils season
1990–91 New Jersey Devils season
1991–92 New Jersey Devils season

San Jose Sharks seasons
1991–92 San Jose Sharks season

References

External links
 The DrewL Bucket: Can OLN Help Rescue NHL?
 NHL inks SCA deal for $5.5m. (cable television contract between National Hockey League and SportsChannel America) (Multichannel News)
 CBA: TV and the price of expansion
 Is the NHL better off?
 ESPN fails to match, Comcast gets NHL
 Dear Uncle Erza
 The NHL on SportsChannel America (1988-1992)
 Great Moments From, er, uh, NHL On SportsChannelAmerica?
 The NHL's latest TV deal is a bad one for fans

1980s American television series
1990s American television series
1988 American television series debuts
1992 American television series endings
National Hockey League on television
SportsChannel
Simulcasts